Tatk Kam Vo is a populated place situated in Pima County, Arizona, United States. It is a small village situated approximately 3.5 miles southwest of Pisinemo, located on the San Xavier Indian Reservation. Historically, it has also been known as Iramit and Nestors. The name is derived from the O'odham phrase meaning "root place charco". Tatk Kam Vo was designated as the official name as a result of a decision by the Board on Geographic Names in 1941. In their recommendation to the BGN in 1939, the Office of Indian Affairs recommended the name be kept as three words, since combining them gave a different meaning.

References

Populated places in Pima County, Arizona